The Fourth of July Creek is a creek on the Kenai Peninsula in Alaska. It rises on the upper Resurrection Peninsula from various glaciers in the Chugach Mountains that drain the Sargeant Icefield and flows  to empty into Resurrection Bay near Seward. Fourth of July Creek formed some time after 1850, when Godwin Glacier retreated from the shores of Resurrection Bay, uncovering the stream and the broad valley it flows through. The creek was formerly known as the Godwin River, before the aforementioned glacier split into two valleys creating a separate tributary of the waterway, today known as Godwin Creek.

Fishing & Recreation
Fishing for salmon is not permitted in the Fourth of July Creek. However, its delta remains a popular fishing spot, as Resurrection Bay has a very productive silver salmon fishery. This delta is at a rocky and sandy coastal area known as Fourth of July Beach, and is publicly accessible by going around the adjacent shipyard's private property.

References

Rivers of Kenai Peninsula Borough, Alaska
Rivers of Alaska